Alec Fraser (  Fraser-Smith; 16 February 1884 – 20 June 1956) was a British actor.

Alec Fraser was born Alec Fraser-Smith in Cupar, Scotland. He died on 20 June 1956, aged 72, in London. His sister was actress/singer Agnes Fraser.

Selected filmography
 The Woman with the Fan (1921)
 The Woman of His Dream (1921)
 The Knave of Diamonds (1921)
 The Will (1921)
 The Bonnie Brier Bush (1921)
 Little Brother of God (1922)
 A Gamble in Lives (1924)
 The Lure (1933)
 The Great Defender (1934)
 The Mystery of the Mary Celeste (1935)
 The Mutiny of the Elsinore (1937)

References

External links
 

1884 births
1956 deaths
Scottish male film actors
Scottish male silent film actors
People from Cupar
20th-century Scottish male actors